Pierre Montenot (November 1, 1884 – June 6, 1953) was a French 20th-century architect. In 1932 he won a gold medal in the art competitions of the Olympic Games together with Gustave Saacké and Pierre Bailly for their design of a "Cirque pour Toros" ("Circus for Bullfights").

References

External links
 
 

1884 births
1953 deaths
20th-century French architects
Olympic gold medalists in art competitions
Medalists at the 1932 Summer Olympics
Olympic competitors in art competitions